Cyanodermella is a genus of fungi within the family Stictidaceae. It contains five species.

References

Ostropales
Lichen genera
Ostropales genera
Taxa described in 1981